The 2016 Japan Super Series was the seventh Superseries tournament of the 2016 BWF Super Series. The tournament took place in Tokyo, Japan from September 20–25, 2016 with a total prize money of $300,000.

Men's singles

Seeds

Top half

Bottom half

Finals

Women's singles

Seeds

Top half

Bottom half

Finals

Men's doubles

Seeds

Top half

Bottom half

Finals

Women's doubles

Seeds

Top half

Bottom half

Finals

Mixed doubles

Seeds

Top half

Bottom half

Finals

References

External links
 Japan Open at www.yonexopenjp.com
 BWF World Superseries at www.bwfworldsuperseries.com

Japan Open (badminton)
Japan
2016 in Japanese sport
Sports competitions in Tokyo